The Bieg Piastów (literally the Piast Race) is a cross-country skiing marathon in Poland. It has been held since 1976. and is part of Worldloppet since 2008.

References

External links
Official website

1976 establishments in Poland
February sporting events
March sporting events
Recurring sporting events established in 1976
Ski marathons
Cross-country skiing competitions in Poland